Orlando City Hall is the headquarters of the City of Orlando government. The downtown city hall is a 9 floor, postmodern building constructed by Lincoln Property Company and completed in 1992. The building is located in downtown Orlando at the CNL Center City Commons building complex, on the corner of South Orange Avenue and South Street.

Construction of the $32 million city hall was overseen by assistant city attorney Lew Oliver and was financed with revenue bonds.

The previous eight-story city hall building was blown up in the opening scene of Lethal Weapon 3.

See also
List of tallest buildings in Orlando

References

External links

Official website
3D Model of Orlando City Hall

Buildings and structures in Orlando, Florida
City and town halls in Florida
Government buildings completed in 1992
Postmodern architecture in Florida
1992 establishments in Florida